Melvin Gibbs is an American bass guitarist who has appeared on close to 200 albums in diverse genres of music. Among others, Gibbs is known for working in jazz with drummer Ronald Shannon Jackson and guitarist Sonny Sharrock, and in rock music with Rollins Band and Arto Lindsay.

Career 

A native of Brooklyn, New York, Gibbs attended Medgar Evers College and the Brooklyn Conservatory of Music. After graduating from Berklee College of Music, Gibbs first came to public notice as a member of the group Defunkt, which was a mainstay of the early 1980s downtown New York scene. Throughout most of the 1980s, he played in drummer Ronald Shannon Jackson's Decoding Society with guitarist Vernon Reid and with guitarist Sonny Sharrock and saxophonist John Zorn. With Jackson and guitarist Bill Frisell he was a member of the group Power Tools. Gibbs co-led the band Eye and I with D.K. Dyson who also co-founded the Black Rock Coalition of which he is an original member.

Gibbs took on the role of record producer while with the Rollins Band in the 1990s. He worked in that capacity, producing records for other artists on Rage Records.

He was a member of the avant-metal Rollins Band from 1993 to about 1998 and again in 2006 when the group briefly reformed. As a member of the Rollins Band, he performed at Woodstock '94 in 1994 and was nominated for a Grammy Award in 1995. Gibbs has also recorded with hip-hop musician Dead Prez, Brazilian musicians Caetano Veloso and Marisa Monte, Latin jazz musician Eddie Palmieri, Nigerian musician Femi Kuti, and guitarist Marc Ribot. He has produced albums by guitarist Arto Lindsay and turntablist DJ Logic.

Gibbs formed the Punk-Funk All-Stars with James Blood Ulmer, Defunkt leader Joseph Bowie, Vernon Reid and Ronald Shannon Jackson. In 1998, Gibbs, guitarist Brandon Ross, and drummer J.T. Lewis formed the trio Harriet Tubman, which continues to perform concerts and record, as of 2022.

Ancients Speak, the first album by Melvin Gibbs' Elevated Entity, was released on March 17, 2009, by Livewired Music. In 2009, he joined the group SociaLybrium with Bernie Worrell of Parliament-Funkadelic, DeWayne "Blackbyrd" McKnight, and J.T. Lewis. The group's album, For You/For Us/For All was released by Livewired in December 2009.

Gibbs' other projects include Melvin Runs the Hoodoo Down with guitarist Pete Cosey and keyboard player John Medeski; the JFM Trio with guitarist Jeff Parker and percussionist Francisco Mora, the Geechee Seminoles with percussionist David Pleasant; Zig Zag Power Trio with guitarist Vernon Reid and drummer Will Calhoun; God Particle with cosmologist/saxophonist Stephon Alexander, David Pleasant, and other musicians; and Melvin Gibbs Magnum.

Discography

As leader or co-leader 
 2003 The Rites with Burnt Sugar (Greg Tate), Butch Morris, Pete Cosey (Avant Groidd Musica)
 2004 Raw Meet with Elliott Sharp, Lance Carter (Intakt)
 2009 Ancients Speak, as Melvin Gibbs' Elevated Entity (LiveWired; rereleased, Melvin Gibbs via bandcamp)
 2010 Christian Marclay: Graffiti Composition with Elliott Sharp, Mary Halvorson, Lee Ranaldo, Vernon Reid
 2010 Electric Willie: a Tribute to Willie Dixon with Elliott Sharp, Henry Kaiser, Queen Esther, Glenn Phillips, Lance Carter (Yellowbird)
 2011 "E-volution" single (rereleased later, Melvin Gibbs via bandcamp)
 2011 Phree-dem downloads (Melvin Gibbs via bandcamp)
 2013 Crossing the Waters with Elliott Sharp,  (Intakt)
 2013 "Still Dreamin'" single (rereleased later, Melvin Gibbs via bandcamp)
 2018 Zig Zag Power Trio with Vernon Reid, Will Calhoun (Woodstock Sessions)
 2020 "Holy Ground: 38th and Chicago – initial thoughts" single (Melvin Gibbs via bandcamp)
 2021 "It's Been a Long Time Coming" single (Melvin Gibbs via bandcamp)
 2021 4 + 1 equals 5 for May 25 (Melvin Gibbs via bandcamp)
 2021 FlyBoy's Bardo EZ Pass single (Melvin Gibbs via bandcamp)
 2022 Anamibia Sessions Vol. 1: The Wave (Editions Mego)

With Defunkt
 1980 Defunkt
 1994 Live & Reunified
 2005 Defunkt/Thermonuclear Sweat

With Rollins Band
 1994 Weight
 1997 Come In and Burn

With Harriet Tubman
 1998 I Am a Man (SlaveNo Mo'/Knitting Factory)
 2000 Prototype (Avant)
 2011 Ascension (Sunnyside)
 2011 Lucent Steps: Ascension Remix single (Melvin Gibbs via bandcamp)
 2017 Araminta (Sunnyside)
 2018: The Terror End of Beauty (Sunnyside)

Other bands
 1987 Strange Meeting, Power Tools
 2010 For You – For Us – For All, Socialybrium

As sideman 
With Jean-Paul Bourelly
 1994 Saints & Sinners
 1997 Fade to Cacophony: Live
 2002 Trance Atlantic

With DJ Logic
 1999 Project Logic
 2001 The Anomaly
 2006 Zen of Logic

With Ronald Shannon Jackson
 1980 Eye on You
 1981 Nasty
 1982 Mandance (Antilles)
 1983 Street Priest
 1983 Barbeque Dog (Antilles)
 1985 Decode Yourself (Island)
 1990 Taboo
 1999 Live in Montreux
 2000 Earned Dreams
 2000 Live at Greenwich House

With Arto Lindsay
 1995 Aggregates 1-26
 1996 Mundo Civilizado
 1996 Subtle Body
 1998 Noon Chill
 1999 Prize
 2000 Ecomixes
 2002 Invoke
 2004 Salt
 2014 Encyclopedia of Arto
 2017 Cuidado Madame

With Marisa Monte
 1991 Mais
 1996 Barulhinho Bom (A Great Noise)

With Sonny Sharrock
 1987 Seize the Rainbow (Enemy)
 1989 Live in New York (Enemy)
 1996 Into Another Light

With Moreno Veloso
 2001 Music Typewriter
 2014 Coisa Boa

With Vitamin C
 1999 Vitamin C
 2000 More

With John Zorn
 1986 The Big Gundown (Elektra)
 1988 Spillane

With others
 1982 Sueño, Eddie Palmieri
 1989 Come Together as One, Will Downing
 1989 Unh!, Philip Tabane
 1990 Metamorphosis, World Saxophone Quartet
 1990 Rootless Cosmopolitans, Marc Ribot
 1991 Circulado, Caetano Veloso
 1991 Lust, Ambitious Lovers
 1995 Very Neon Pet, Peter Scherer
 1997 Terra Incognita, Chris Whitley
 1998 Black Music, Chocolate Genius
 1999 Mustango, Jean-Louis Murat
 1999 Pasajes de un Sueno, Ana Torroja
 1999 Return of Kill Dog E, Scotty Hard
 2000 Let's Get Free, Dead Prez
 2000 Menace to Sobriety, OPM
 2003 Deeper Than Oceans, Kazufumi Miyazawa
 2004 Ten, Ellery Eskelin
 2010 The Art of Bellydance, Bellydance Superstars
 2020 Marching Music, Dave Douglas (Greenleaf)

References

External links 
Official website

Living people
Year of birth missing (living people)
Guitarists from New York (state)
Jazz musicians from New York (state)
Musicians from Brooklyn
Berklee College of Music alumni
African-American record producers
African-American rock musicians
Alternative metal bass guitarists
American jazz bass guitarists
American male bass guitarists
Record producers from New York (state)
Jazz fusion bass guitarists
Rollins Band members
American male jazz musicians
20th-century American bass guitarists
20th-century American male musicians
Intakt Records artists
African-American guitarists
20th-century African-American musicians
21st-century African-American people